Bird College – Conservatoire for Dance and Musical Theatre is an independent performing arts school and college, located in Sidcup, South East London, in the London Borough of Bexley.

The college was founded as a dance school by Doreen Bird in 1946 and now provides specialist vocational training in dance and musical theatre, at further and higher education level. The college is one of many providers of vocational performing arts training in the United Kingdom. In addition, the college also receives a grant from Bexley Council to provide music services to schools in the borough.

The college prepares students for a professional career in the performing arts and has a reputation of feeding artists into West End and Broadway theatre, dance companies, television, film, pop music and other high-profile areas of the entertainments industry. Key areas of study include ballet, tap, jazz and contemporary dance, singing, voice craft and drama.

Bird College is an accredited college of the Council for Dance Education and Training. Full-time students at the college study for either the Diploma in Professional Musical Theatre, validated by Trinity College, London, or the BA Hons in Professional Dance and Musical Theatre, validated by the University of Greenwich. The college is also an approved dance centre of the Imperial Society of Teachers of Dancing (ISTD), and students can study towards the ISTD dance teaching qualifications.

History

Overview

Doreen Bird first founded the Doreen Bird School of Dance in Sidcup in 1946. This was the predecessor of today's Bird College. Bird initially taught pupils in her parents' living room, rolling up the carpet to provide a suitable dance surface, although she later used a local church hall. In 1951, she established a full-time performing arts course with six students, which became known as the Doreen Bird College of Performing Arts.

In 1954 Doreen Bird acquired a former vicarage, which was renamed Vicarage House and would be the college's first permanent premises. In 1964, it moved to Studio House, which continued in daily use by the college until 2016. To enable the college to expand, it became necessary to seek larger premises and in 1979, Bird was successful in securing the freehold of a former Victorian school, which was converted into dance studios and was renamed Birkbeck Centre. Birkbeck Centre was officially opened by former Prime Minister, Sir Edward Heath and was the college's main campus until 2007. In 2007, as part of the college's contract to provide pre-vocational music and dance services on behalf of Bexley Council, Bird College was granted residency of the former Bexley Centre for Music & Dance, which became the college's principal campus, renamed The Centre. The college vacated all of its existing buildings early in 2016, with the acquisition of a new one-site facility on Alma Road in Sidcup.

The Doreen Bird College of Performing Arts first offered a nationally recognised qualification with the introduction of a National Diploma validated by Trinity College. In 1997, the college became the first of its kind in the United Kingdom to offer a professional dance degree, with the introduction of the BA Hons Degree in Dance & Theatre Performance. This course was specially devised for the college as a collaboration between Doreen Bird and the University of Greenwich who validate the qualification. In 2004, the National Diploma course was regraded to Level 6 on the National Qualifications Framework, becoming the National Diploma in Professional Musical Theatre. The college has further expanded its range of courses with the introduction of the Foundation Degree in Creative Industries: Acting and the MA by Research in Dance & Theatre Performance, both validated by the University of Greenwich. A one-year pre-vocational foundation course has also been established, which offers an intensive course of study for students who need extra preparation before applying for a place on a full professional course.

Doreen Bird was principal of the Doreen Bird College of Performing Arts until her retirement in 1998, when she appointed Sue Passmore as Principal and Executive Director. It is also around this time that the name Bird College was first introduced, replacing the full title that had previously been used. Bird continued to be a trustee and Governor of the college for the rest of her life and in 1999 she was awarded an honorary Master of Arts by the University of Greenwich, in recognition of her achievements. She died on 4 February 2004 and a memorial service was held at The Actor's Church in Covent Garden.

Before becoming Principal of the college in 1998, Sue Passmore had previously been Head of Theatre at the former Bush Davies School of Theatre Arts. She joined the Doreen Bird College of Performing Arts in 1988, as Artistic Co-ordinator and Head of Drama, becoming Artistic Director in 1989. She founded the Bird Theatre Company in 1991 and was also appointed to the Executive Council of the Imperial Society of Teachers of Dancing. After becoming the college's Principal and Executive Director in 1998, she held the post for seven years. Passmore retired from Bird College in 2005.

Since 2005, the college has been managed by Shirley Coen as Principal & Chief Executive and Luis Abreu as Deputy Principal. De Abreu is an alumnus of the college, serving as Deputy CEO & Artistic Director but formerly he was Head of Acting and Head of Performance Studies.  In 2019 De Abreu became joint Principal with Coen and in 2022 he became Principal and Artistic Director. Coen and De Abreu are both trustees of the Doreen Bird Foundation.

In 2007 till 2021, Bird College became the providers of pre-vocational music and dance services for the London Borough of Bexley, working in partnership with Bexley Council.

Productions 
Live performances are an integral part of the curriculum and the college perform in public under the title of 'Bird Theatre Company', staging productions both in the UK and Internationally.

Bird College productions have been staged at the Whitworth Theatre, the Bloomsbury Theatre and from 1982 at the Churchill Theatre in Bromley, then for a number of years at the Peacock Theatre. Bird College have also performed at the Shaw Theatre, Sadler's Wells and the Royal Opera House and currently perform regularly at the Shaw Theatre and the Orchard Theatre in Dartford.

Bird College takes part in the annual event, 'Move It Dance London', the largest dance exhibition in the UK. Bird students perform in the showcase and give demonstrations, with staff of the college teaching workshops and giving lectures.

Pre-vocational music and dance 
Bird College used to provide a variety of pre-vocational music services throughout the Bexley region.

Services 
 Free instrumental and vocal tuition in schools, for pupils at Key Stage 2
 Individual and shared instrumental/vocal lessons
 Progressive choirs, bands and orchestras
 Hire of musical instruments

Examinations 
ISTD

Groups 

Elgar Wind Ensemble
Intermediate Band
Symphonic Wind Band
Bexley Band
Little Big Band
Brass Tacks
Whirlwinds
First Strings
Purcell Strings
Concert Orchestra
Bexley Youth Orchestra
Light Orchestra
Junior Choir
Intermediate Choir
Bexley Youth Choir
The Bexley Choir

Facilities

Alma Road
In November, Bird College moved to its new campus on Alma Road in Sidcup, bringing all of the college's facilities onto one site for the first time. The Alma Road site was originally built as the Sidcup Secondary School (1955–1965), with two matching adjacent buildings; one for girls and one for boys. One of these buildings now houses Birkbeck Primary School. The second, which now houses Bird College, was used as the Sidcup Adult Education Centre prior to its acquisition by Bird College. An architectural competition was launched by the Royal Institute of British Architects in the autumn of 2011, with the design brief for a complete overhaul of the site, providing state of the art facilities for the college. The winning designs were submitted by Hoskins Architects of Glasgow, work started in 2015. The college took partial residence of the building in the autumn of 2015 and almost full residence in November 2016. Additional phases of construction are ongoing and are expected to be completed in November 2016.

Former
From 1965 onward the college was based at Studio House, a detached Georgian property occupying the corner plot of Station Road and Crescent Road in Sidcup. Originally a residential property, the ground floor reception rooms were used as dance studios until the 1990s, when a large studio/theatre extension was built on what was the rear garden. Studio House was the college's principal campus until the acquisition of Birkbeck Centre in the 1970s.

Birkbeck Centre was a former Victorian school situated on the corner of Birkbeck Road and Clarence Crescent in Sidcup. Acquired for the college in 1977, it was extensively refurbished and re-opened by Prime Minister and Bexley MP, Sir Edward Heath. Birkbeck Centre comprised a number of dance studios of different sizes, including a large studio located in a pre-fabricated building to the rear of the property. Adjacent to Birkbeck Centre was the Admin Cottage, which housed the college's administrative, marketing and finance teams, the Principal's office and a teachers rest room and kitchen. Birkbeck Centre remained the college's primary campus until 2007 when the college moved to 'The Centre' on Station Road.

Studio House, Birkbeck Centre and the Admin Cottage were sold in early 2016.

The Centre
The Centre Bird college's previous main site is a former school located on Station Road in Sidcup. It is now a music and dance complex owned by the London Borough of Bexley and was previously known as the Bexley Academy of Music and Performing Arts. It is used primarily as a venue for pre-vocational dance and music training. Since becoming the officially approved provider for music provision in the London Borough of Bexley in 2007, Bird College has taken residency of the building and is responsible for the management of the site. The College has, however, used the facilities at the site for some time, holding classes for its full-time performing arts courses. The Centre offers (within the main building and annexes on site) a range of dance studios with sprung flooring and installed sound systems, tuition/practice rooms and performance opportunities in the larger studios.

Notable students 

Bird College has a number of well-known and notable alumni. It has become known for producing dance and theatre excellence. Former students are working worldwide in all areas of the entertainments industry, particularly dance and musical theatre, including West End and Broadway shows. Many also work as directors, choreographers, producers, agents, personal managers and teachers.

Helen Anker – began training at the Royal Ballet Lower School, later training in musical theatre at Bird College. She is noted for performances in the musical Beautiful and Damned and Susan Stroman's dance musical Contact. Most recently, she has played lead roles in the English National Opera production of On The Town and the first major London production of Parade at the Donmar Warehouse
Gary Avis – trained at Bird College and the Royal Ballet School. He joined The Royal Ballet in 1989 and was promoted to Soloist in 1995. In 1999 he was a co-founder of K-ballet in Japan, also appearing in the Channel 4 documentary series "Ballet Boyz". Avis later joined English National Ballet as First Soloist in 2002, returning to the Royal Ballet in 2004. He was promoted to Principal Character Artist in 2005 and Assistant Ballet Master in 2007.
Warren Carlyle – was Associate Choreographer for the Broadway and West End theatre revivals of the Mel Brooks musical The Producers, working with Choreographer, Susan Stroman. He was Associate Choreographer for the 2005 film revival, also performing as a cast member in both the London and New York theatre productions. He also danced in the film Center Stage
Melanie C – trained at Bird College before becoming a member of the Spice Girls.
Sue Hodge – trained at Bird College and has subsequently worked extensively in theatre and on television. Best known for her portrayal of Mimi Labonq in the long-running BBC sitcom 'Allo 'Allo!, her credits also include numerous West End and touring theatre productions and other television series' and appearances such as Noel's House Party, Royal Variety Performance and Children in Need.
Gavin Lee – most noted for creating the role of 'Bert' in the West End premiere of Mary Poppins The Musical, a role which he later re-created for the new Broadway production of the show. He has received both Olivier Award and Tony Award nominations for this role.
John Partridge – has performed a number of critically acclaimed roles in West End musicals and throughout Europe. He is most noted for his performance of 'Rum-Tum-Tugger' in the official film of Andrew Lloyd Webber's musical Cats, but Partridge has also played leading roles in musicals such as Starlight Express, Notre Dame de Paris, Rent and Taboo. Since February 2008, Partridge has been a cast member of the long-running British soap opera EastEnders.
Lara Pulver – trained at Bird College, graduating with a BA (Hons) Degree in 2000. She has appeared in a number of productions including Into The Woods at the Royal Opera House in Covent Garden, Honk!, High Society and A Chorus Line. In 2008, Pulver received a Laurence Olivier Award nomination for 'Best Actress in a Musical', for her performance in the West End production of Parade at the Donmar Warehouse. Her television appearances include the BBC drama series Robin Hood and HBO's True Blood.
Aaron Sillis – trained at Bird College gaining the National Diploma in Professional Dance. Has performed in many award-winning productions by the choreographer Matthew Bourne, including Swan Lake, Nutcracker!, The Car Man and Dorian Gray. Has also worked as a dancer and choreographer for Kylie Minogue, Take That, Sugababes and Victoria Beckham. Winner of The Times Breakthrough Award sponsored at the 2009 South Bank Show Awards.

References

Resources
 Doreen Bird – ISTD Autobiography
 University of Greenwich Press Release – Doreen Bird, Honorary MA
 Gavin Lee, Olivier Award Interview
 Bexley Council Press Release – Junior Music & Dance Provision
 Obituary of Doreen Bird – See page 4
 Council for Dance Education & Training (CDET) – List of Accredited Dance & Musical Theatre Courses
 Dance and Drama Awards (DADA) Scheme – List of colleges offering Government funded places

External links

Bird College – Official website
Council for Dance Education and Training

Schools of the performing arts in the United Kingdom
Dance schools in the United Kingdom
Drama schools in London
Dance in London
Educational institutions established in 1945
1945 establishments in England
Education in the London Borough of Bexley
Buildings and structures in Sidcup